The  is an electric multiple unit (EMU) train type operated on the Yurakucho and Fukutoshin subway lines of Tokyo Metro in Japan since 2006.

Design
The trains are manufactured by Hitachi with aluminium bodies to its "A-train" concept.

The 10000 series was the first new model to be built for Tokyo Metro following privatization. The front-end design is intended to evoke the appearance of the 300 series trains, which were the first trains used on the Marunouchi Line.

On set numbers 10105 onward, built from 2007, the gold colour line was omitted on the front ends.

Operations
 Tokyo Metro Fukutoshin Line (from June 2008)
 Tokyo Metro Yurakucho Line (from September 2006)
 Tobu Tojo Line (from September 2006)
 Seibu Yurakucho Line (from February 2007)
 Seibu Ikebukuro Line (from February 2007)
 Tokyu Toyoko Line (from September 2012)
 Minatomirai Line (from September 2012)

The fleet of 10-car sets operate on the Yurakucho and Fukutoshin lines, including inter-running services over the Tobu Tojo Line between Wakōshi Station and Shinrinkōen Station, and also services over the Seibu Yurakucho and Ikebukuro Lines between Kotake-mukaihara Station and Hannō Station.

The trains were designed to allow 2 intermediate cars (cars 5 and 6) to be removed easily to create 8-car sets when through-running commences from the Fukutoshin Line to the Tokyu Toyoko Line in 2013. From 7 September 2012, five sets (10101 to 10105) were reformed as 8-car sets to cover for a shortage in 8-car 7000 series trainsets. These sets are identified by the addition of "8 CARS" stickers on the cab windows. They were introduced on Tokyu Toyoko Line and Minatomirai Line services, several months before the planned start of through-running operations. Once the shortage in 8-car 7000 series trainsets was over these 8-car sets were subsequently reformed back into 10-car sets.

Formation
, the fleet consists of 36 ten-car sets (numbered 01 to 36), formed as follows, with car 1 at the northern (Wakoshi) end.

Cars 3 and 9 each have two single-arm pantographs, while car 6 has one.

When necessary, the trains can be shortened to eight cars, formed as follows.

Cars 3 and 9 each have two single-arm pantographs.

Interior
Passenger accommodation consists of longitudinal bench seating throughout. Priority seats are provided at the ends of each car, and cars 2 and 9 have wheelchair spaces. Car 9 is designated as a "moderately air-conditioned" car.

History

The first set was delivered in May 2006, and entered service on the Tokyo Metro Yurakucho Line and Tobu Tojo Line in September 2006, allowing four 07 series sets to be transferred to the Tozai Line to replace the remaining 5000 series sets. 10000 series sets entered service on the Seibu Line in February 2007. At the start of Fukutoshin Line services in June 2008, a total of 22 sets had been delivered. And as of 1 April 2015 the fleet consists of 36 ten-car sets.

8-car 10000 series sets entered service on the Tokyu Toyoko Line and Minatomirai Line from 7 September 2012. These 8-car sets were subsequently reformed back into 10-car sets.

From April 2016, the original three-colour LED destination indicator panels on some sets were replaced with full-colour LED indicator panels.

Gallery

References

External links

 Tokyo Metro 10000 series information 
 Tokyo Metro 10000 series (Japan Railfan Magazine Online) 

Electric multiple units of Japan
10000 series
Hitachi multiple units
Train-related introductions in 2006
1500 V DC multiple units of Japan